William Ford De Saussure (February 22, 1792March 13, 1870) was a United States senator from South Carolina. Born in Charleston, the son of Henry William de Saussure and Elizabeth Ford De Saussure.

Legal career 

He graduated from Harvard University in 1810, studied law, was admitted to the bar and practiced in Charleston and Columbia.

In the 1820s de Saussure served two terms as Intendent, or Mayor, of the City of Columbia. He was a member of the South Carolina House of Representatives in 1846 and a judge of the chancery court in 1847.

De Saussure was appointed May 10, 1852, and then elected November 29, 1852, as a Democrat to the U.S. Senate to fill the vacancy caused by the resignation of R. Barnwell Rhett and served from May 10, 1852, to March 4, 1853.

He resumed the practice of law in Columbia, and was a trustee of South Carolina College (now the University of South Carolina) at Columbia for many years. In December 1860 he was a delegate to South Carolina's Secession Convention and became a signer of the Ordinance of Secession which led directly to the opening hostilities of the Civil War.

Death 
He died in Columbia in 1870; interment was in the First Presbyterian Churchyard.

Famous family members
The descendants of William Ford De Saussure include Arthur Ravenel, Jr. (1927-), a member of the United States Congress who represented South Carolina from 1987 to 1995.

References

External links
 

1792 births
1870 deaths
Harvard University alumni
Democratic Party members of the South Carolina House of Representatives
South Carolina state court judges
Democratic Party United States senators from South Carolina
Mayors of Columbia, South Carolina
Lawyers from Columbia, South Carolina
William F
19th-century American politicians
19th-century American judges
19th-century American lawyers